Babita Lalit Mandlik (born 16 July 1981) is an Indian cricketer who plays as a right-handed batter. She appeared in 
3 One Day International and 2 Twenty20 Internationals for India between 2003 and 2010. She has played state cricket for Madhya Pradesh, Railways and Delhi.

Mandlik has one child, a daughter, and took a break from cricket to give birth before later returning to the game.

References

External links

Living people
1981 births
Cricketers from Indore
Indian women cricketers
India women One Day International cricketers
India women Twenty20 International cricketers
Madhya Pradesh women cricketers
Railways women cricketers
Delhi women cricketers
Central Zone women cricketers
21st-century Indian women